Lead oxides are a group of inorganic compounds with formulas including lead (Pb) and oxygen (O).

Common lead oxides include:

 Lead(II) oxide, PbO, litharge (red), massicot (yellow)
 Lead(II,IV) oxide, Pb3O4, minium, red lead
 Lead dioxide (lead(IV) oxide), PbO2

Less common lead oxides are:
 Lead(II,IV) oxide, Pb2O3, lead sesquioxide (reddish yellow)
 Pb12O19 (monoclinic, dark-brown or black crystals)
 The so-called black lead oxide, which is a mixture of PbO and fine-powdered metal Pb and used in the production of lead–acid batteries.

Lead compounds
Oxides